Delview Secondary is a public high school in Delta, British Columbia, Canada. It is managed by the School District 37 Delta. The school mascot is a Raider and the colours are black, white and red. The school educates around 800 students under the principal, Mr. Kevin Vasconcelos.

History

The school was established in 1969 and shared premises at North Delta Secondary School. In February 1970, the school moved to its permanent site at 116th Street.

Seismic upgrading of the school was approved in April 2006 and was completed by fall 2007.

Classes for students in grades 11 and 12 were added in 2006–07 and the school now supports a full 8–12 curriculum, no longer requiring students to switch over to North Delta Secondary School after 10th grade.

Sport
The Vancouver Whitecaps soccer team has established the Whitecaps Delta School Academy, for Grades 8–10 boys at Delview. The academy opened in September 2008.

Notable alumni
 Chris Crippin – drummer for Hedley

References

External links

 Official site
 District site

High schools in Delta, British Columbia
Educational institutions established in 1969
1969 establishments in British Columbia